George Stewart (16 November 1932 – 22 May 1998) was a Scottish footballer, who played as a goalkeeper for Petershill Juniors, Raith Rovers, Stirling Albion, Montrose and Bradford City.

Born in Larkhall in 1932, Stewart started his career with junior side Petershill. He was capped by the Scotland junior select team while with the club in 1951. He joined the senior game when he signed for Raith Rovers in 1952. He made 68 appearances in the Scottish Football League for three clubs in seven seasons, before moving to England to join Bradford City in 1959. He made 22 Football League appearances before leaving the senior game in 1961.

References

External links 

1932 births
1998 deaths
Bradford City A.F.C. players
Association football goalkeepers
Montrose F.C. players
Petershill F.C. players
Raith Rovers F.C. players
Scottish Football League players
Scottish footballers
Stirling Albion F.C. players
English Football League players
Sportspeople from Larkhall
Footballers from South Lanarkshire
Scotland junior international footballers
Scottish Junior Football Association players